Szűcs is a Hungarian surname meaning "furrier". Notable people with the name include:

 Csaba Szűcs (born 1965), Hungarian marathon runner
 Csaba Szücs (born 1987), Slovak team handball player
 Erika Szűcs (born 1951), Hungarian politician and economist
 Gábor Szűcs (born 1956), Hungarian cyclist
 Gabriella Szűcs (born 1984), Romanian-born Hungarian team handball player
 Gabriella Szűcs (water polo) (born 1988), Hungarian water polo player
 György Szűcs (1912–1991), Hungarian footballer
 István Szűcs (born 1985), Hungarian footballer
 Jenő Szűcs (1928–1988), Hungarian historian
 Lajos Szűcs (disambiguation), multiple people, including:
Lajos Szűcs (footballer born 1943), Hungarian football striker
Lajos Szűcs (footballer born 1973), Hungarian football goalkeeper
Lajos Szűcs (politician) (born 1964), Hungarian politician and Member of Parliament
Lajos Szűcs (weightlifter) (born 1946), Hungarian weightlifter
 László Szűcs (born 1991), Hungarian footballer
 Sándor Szűcs (1921–1951), Hungarian footballer
 Fruzsina Szűcs (born 1998), Hungarian pianist
Szűcs Judith (born 1953) Hungarian singer.
  Szűcs Gedeon (born ?Aba) hungarian révolution 1848/1849,  resistant leader from Aba town.
Szűts György (betyár/outlaw/criminal) sentenced to life imprisonment for robberies and thefts.
Szűcs  zene YellowNita groupe de musique YellowNita
(YellowNita)

See also
 Szuć, Polish village
Szúcs, hungarian village  https://fr.m.wikipedia.org/wiki/Sz%C3%BAcs

Hungarian-language surnames